Nicippe, also Nikippe (Ancient Greek: Νικίππη) is a name attributed to several women in Greek mythology.
 Nicippe, a priestess of Demeter in Dotion, Thessaly. Demeter assumes her shape to try to stop Erysichthon from cutting down the sacred grove.
Nicippe, a Pisatian princess as daughter of King Pelops and Hippodamia, daughter of the earlier king Oenomaus. She became queen of Mycenae after marrying King Sthenelus by whom she bore Alcyone, Medusa (Astymedusa) and Eurystheus. Nicippe was also known as Antibia or Archippe.
 Nicippe, a Thespian princess as one of the 50 daughters of King Thespius and Megamede or by one of his many wives. When Heracles hunted and ultimately slayed the Cithaeronian lion, Nicippe with her other sisters, except for one, all laid with the hero in a night, a week or for 50 days as what their father strongly desired it to be. Nicippe bore Heracles a son, Antimachus.

Also known is one apparently historical figure of this name:
 Nicippe, daughter of Paseas, who dedicated a statue to Aphrodite Symmachia at the temple in Mantinea which was founded to commemorate the alliance of the Mantineans with the Romans in the Battle of Actium.

Notes

References 

 Apollodorus, The Library with an English Translation by Sir James George Frazer, F.B.A., F.R.S. in 2 Volumes, Cambridge, MA, Harvard University Press; London, William Heinemann Ltd. 1921. ISBN 0-674-99135-4. Online version at the Perseus Digital Library. Greek text available from the same website.
 Athenaeus of Naucratis, The Deipnosophists or Banquet of the Learned. London. Henry G. Bohn, York Street, Covent Garden. 1854. Online version at the Perseus Digital Library.
 Athenaeus of Naucratis, Deipnosophistae. Kaibel. In Aedibus B.G. Teubneri. Lipsiae. 1887. Greek text available at the Perseus Digital Library.
 Callimachus, Callimachus and Lycophron with an English translation by A. W. Mair ; Aratus, with an English translation by G. R. Mair, London: W. Heinemann, New York: G. P. Putnam 1921. Internet Archive
 Callimachus, Works. A.W. Mair. London: William Heinemann; New York: G.P. Putnam's Sons. 1921. Greek text available at the Perseus Digital Library.
 Diodorus Siculus, The Library of History translated by Charles Henry Oldfather. Twelve volumes. Loeb Classical Library. Cambridge, Massachusetts: Harvard University Press; London: William Heinemann, Ltd. 1989. Vol. 3. Books 4.59–8. Online version at Bill Thayer's Web Site
 Diodorus Siculus, Bibliotheca Historica. Vol 1-2. Immanel Bekker. Ludwig Dindorf. Friedrich Vogel. in aedibus B. G. Teubneri. Leipzig. 1888-1890. Greek text available at the Perseus Digital Library.
 Pausanias, Description of Greece with an English Translation by W.H.S. Jones, Litt.D., and H.A. Ormerod, M.A., in 4 Volumes. Cambridge, MA, Harvard University Press; London, William Heinemann Ltd. 1918. . Online version at the Perseus Digital Library
 Pausanias, Graeciae Descriptio. 3 vols. Leipzig, Teubner. 1903. Greek text available at the Perseus Digital Library.
 Tzetzes, John, Book of Histories, Book II-IV translated by Gary Berkowitz from the original Greek of T. Kiessling's edition of 1826. Online version at theio.com

Greek mythological priestesses
Princesses in Greek mythology
Queens in Greek mythology
Women of Heracles